Metodi Stoynev (born 15 October 1973) is a former Bulgarian footballer, who played as a forward.

Honours

Club 
Lokomotiv Plovdiv
 A Group: 2003–04
 Bulgarian Supercup: 2004

References

1973 births
Living people
Bulgarian footballers
First Professional Football League (Bulgaria) players
PFC Pirin Gotse Delchev players
PFC Dobrudzha Dobrich players
PFC Litex Lovech players
PFC Spartak Varna players
PFC Velbazhd Kyustendil players
PFC Lokomotiv Plovdiv players
Liaoning F.C. players
Beijing Renhe F.C. players
OFC Vihren Sandanski players
PFC Rodopa Smolyan players
Association football forwards
Expatriate footballers in China